Texas Military College was a military school located in the city of Terrell, Texas, United States.

History
Texas Military College, a private primary school, high school, and junior college in Terrell, began operation in September 1915. The college was founded, owned, and presided over by Louis Clausiel Perry, who came to Terrell from Missouri by 1915 and stayed until his death in 1926, after which his widow, Minnie E. Perry, operated the school until February 1949, when she sold the institution's physical plant and grounds to the Southern Bible Institute.

Perry, who served as president of Scarritt-Morrisville College, in Missouri, from 1909 until 1915, was attracted to Terrell as a result of discussions with members of the Terrell Commercial Club. They convinced him that facilities left vacant when Wesley College moved from Terrell to Greenville in 1912 were ideal for the foundation of a new school. These buildings had housed institutions of learning since 1897, when W. B. Toon, son-in-law of Robert A. Terrell, established Toon College on the grounds of the Terrell homestead. The octagonal Terrell house became the administration building. Toon College became Terrell University School in 1901, with Toon as principal. By 1904 it was succeeded by the Methodist-run North Texas University School, headed by Rev. Joseph J. Morgan. In 1909 the name was changed to Wesley College, and the Methodists continued to operate the institution in Terrell until they moved it to Greenville. Perry purchased the existing physical plant in 1914 and, with the assistance of local leaders, improved its condition.

Texas Military College opened on September 21, 1915, with Perry as president and professor of philosophy and oratory. He implemented a unique educational and housing system at the school. Under the "home group system," students coming from the same general geographical region were housed together under the supervision of a resident professor. It was believed that under this system the school's instructors and administrators could closely monitor each student's educational, moral, and physical progress. The school offered three levels of instruction: a junior school (grades three through seven), a high school, and a junior college. The physical plant that Perry purchased in 1914 consisted of an administration building and two dormitories; the success that the institution found in attracting students is suggested by the fact that by the time of Perry's death in 1926, the administration building had been enlarged, several new buildings had been constructed, and student enrollment reached 150. In 1940 the institution built an armory, and enrollment had risen to 250. The college temporarily ceased operations in 1943; enrollment was low during World War II, in which a number of the faculty took part. The school reopened in 1946, with B. B. Abrams as president, but was unable to maintain itself. In 1947 Mrs. Perry deeded the property to the city of Terrell. The community, however, also proved unable to operate the institution on a paying basis and returned control to Mrs. Perry. In 1949 she sold the school's physical plant and grounds to the Southern Bible Institute, which in 1950 established a junior college for blacks, Southwestern Christian College, at the location.

Source:  Handbook of Texas Online, s.v. "," http://www.tshaonline.org/handbook/online/articles/kbt15 (accessed July 31, 2006).

Notable graduates/students
Jack Lummus, 1937 graduate of TMC; 1941 graduate of Baylor University; 1941 member of New York Giants; U.S. Marine Corps Reserve Lieutenant; posthumously awarded Medal of Honor for actions at Battle of Iwo Jima March 8, 1945.

External links
Handbook of Texas Online

Defunct private universities and colleges in Texas
Defunct schools in Texas
Educational institutions established in 1915
1915 establishments in Texas